The information superhighway (or ) is a late-20th-entury phrase that aspirationally referred to the increasingly mainstream availability of digital communication systems (and ultimately, the Internet and its World Wide Web).

To some extent, it is associated with United States Senator and later Vice-President Al Gore.

Definitions
There are a number of definitions of this term. The 1996 publication Wired Style: Principles of English Usage in the Digital Age defines the term as "the whole digital enchilada - interactive, cable, broadband, 500-channel [...] then-Senator Al Gore Jr. introduced it at a 1978 meeting of computer industry folk, in homage to his father, Senator Albert Gore Sr."

The McGraw-Hill Computer Desktop Encyclopedia, published in 2001, defines the term as "a proposed high-speed communications system that was touted by the Clinton/Gore administration to enhance education in America in the 21st century. Its purpose was to help all citizens regardless of their income level. The Internet was originally cited as a model for this superhighway; however, with the explosion of the World Wide Web, the Internet became the information superhighway".

The Oxford English Dictionary (OED) defines the term as "a route or network for the high-speed transfer of information; esp. (a) a proposed national fiber-optic network in the United States; (b) the Internet." The OED also cites usage of this term in three periodicals:
the January 3, 1983 issue of Newsweek: "...information superhighways being built of fiber-optic cable will link Boston, New York, Philadelphia, and Washington, D. C. in a 776-mile system on the East Coast."
the December 19, 1991 issue of the Christian Science Monitor: "Senator Gore calls NREN the "information superhighway" - a catalyst for what he hopes will become one day a national fiber-optic network."
the October 26, 1993 issue of the New York Times: "One of the technologies Vice President Al Gore is pushing is the information superhighway, which will link everyone at home or office to everything else—movies and television shows, shopping services, electronic mail and huge collections of data."

The working paper No.179, 1994, of the Center for Coordination Science at Massachusetts Institute of Technology describes the concept as follows: "The information superhighway directly connects millions of people, each both a consumer of information and a potential provider. (...) Most predictions about commercial opportunities on the information superhighway focus on the provision of information products, such as video on demand, and on new sales outlets for physical products, as with home shopping. (...) The information superhighway brings together millions of individuals who could exchange information with one another. Any conception of a traditional market for making beneficial exchanges, such as an agricultural market or trading pit, or any system where individuals respond to posted prices on a computer screen is woefully inadequate for the extremely large number of often complex trades that will be required."

Earlier similar phrases 
Some other people used the term "superhighway" in application to telecommunications even earlier.

In 1964, M. Brotherton in his book "Masers and Lasers; How They Work, What They Do" on p. 5, wrote about laser beams and used the term "superhighways" for communication.

In 1974, Nam June Paik used the term "super highway" in application to telecommunications, which gave rise to the opinion that he may have been the author of the term "information superhighway". In fact, in his 1974 proposal "Media Planning for the Postindustrial Society – The 21st century is now only 26 years away" to the Rockefeller Foundation he used a slightly different phrase, "electronic super highway":

In 1972, Andrew Targowski presented the Polish National Development Program at the State Council for Informatics, which included the plan of developing the public computer network INFOSTRADA (INFO-STRADA), with autostrada meaning motorway in Polish. Later this plan and its topology were published in his book INFORMATYKA modele rozwoju i systemów (INFORMATICS, models of development and systems)

The building of new electronic super highways will become an even huger enterprise. Assuming we connect New York with Los Angeles by means of an electronic telecommunication network that operates in strong transmission ranges, as well as with continental satellites, wave guides, bundled coaxial cable, and later also via laser beam fiber optics: the expenditure would be about the same as for a Moon landing, except that the benefits in term of by-products would be greater.

See also

Al Gore and information technology
National Information Infrastructure
The Superhighway Summit
Knowledge policy
Cyberspace
Global village
HTTP and HTTPS

References

Further reading 
Articles
Andrews, Edmund. "Policy Blueprint Ready for Data Superhighway." New York Times, Sept. 15, 1993.
 Besser, Howard. "The Information SuperHighway: Social and Cultural Impact," 1995.

Ferranti, Marc. "Europe Seeks a Lane on Info Highway," International Herald Tribune, October 1995.
 Gore, Al. "Remarks given by Vice President Gore at The Superhighway Summit, UCLA," January 11, 1994.
"Information Superhighways: The Next Information Revolution." The Futurist, January–February 1991, Vol. 25: 21-23.
 Kahn, Jeffery. "Building and Rescuing the Information Superhighway," 1993.
Special Issue: TIME magazine, 12 April 1993. "Take A Trip into the Future on the ELECTRONIC SUPERHIGHWAY"
 Gomery, Douglas. "What's At the End of the Infobahn?," American Journalism Review, May 1996.

Magazine covers
Special Issue: TIME magazine, 12 April 1993. "The Info Highway: Bringing a revolution in entertainment, news, and communication"
Popular Mechanics, January, 1994. "Understanding the Information Superhighway"

Internet terminology
History of the Internet
1970s neologisms